Callophrys avis, the Chapman's green hairstreak is a small butterfly found in the Palearctic (Southwest Europe, Algeria, Morocco, Tunisia) that belongs to the blues family. The males and females of this little butterfly are identical. The underside of the wings is green, the upperside is greyish brown. The green verso is marked by a mediodiscal white line that differentiates this species from Callophrys rubi. The larva feeds on Coriaria myrtifolia, Arbutus unedo, Salvia verbenaca, Viburnum tinus.

See also
List of butterflies of Europe

References

Callophrys
Butterflies described in 1909